Various logos and emblems have been used to represent the Collectivity of Saint Martin. The most recent coat of arms used by the collectivity were adopted in 2010.

Other logos and emblems
One logo used by the territorial council, contains the name "Saint-Martin", with "Caraïbe Française" and "French Caribbean" written in small text below. A blue ribbon depicts the stylized letter "S", while a green ribbon depicts a stylized "M".

Another logo, used by the tax department, depicts a gray outline of the island of Saint Martin with a bird flapping its wing.

There is another coat of the which was used. It features palm leaves in front of a sun to symbolize the tropical climate, a pelican symbolizing the fauna of the island, a hibiscus symbolizing the flora, a ship symbolizing the tourism-related boating and the words "Collectivité de Saint Martin" on the top. The commune that existed until 22 February 2007 used similar arms but with the legend "Ville de Saint Martin".

Gallery

See also
 Flag of Saint Martin

References

Saint Martin (France)
Saint Martin Collectivity
Saint Martin Collectivity
Saint Martin Collectivity
Saint Martin
Saint Martin